Clarke Quay MRT station is an underground Mass Rapid Transit (MRT) station on the North East line in Singapore River planning area, Singapore, located underneath Eu Tong Sen Street and New Bridge Road near the junctions of Merchant Road and North Canal Road.

Despite its name, Clarke Quay station is not physically located within Clarke Quay which lies on the northern bank of the Singapore River. Rather, the station is built along the southern bank of the river, directly connected to Clarke Quay Central. The station is located on the opposite side of the Singapore River where Clarke Quay is actually situated. This MRT station is near Fort Canning MRT station and Chinatown MRT station.

History

Clarke Quay MRT station was first announced for the North East Line announcement on 4 March 1996. On the 23 June 1997, North East Line Contract 708 was awarded to Nishimatsu Construction – Lum Chang Building Contractors – Bachy Soletanche Singapore Joint-Venture (JV) on 23 June 1997 for $171.2 million.

To facilitate the construction of the MRT station, the government had a mandatory acquisition of HDB flats in Clarke Quay together with Ellenborough Market in 1995-96 and residents were shifted out to the new estates such as Tampines, Jurong West and Bukit Panjang. Residents were told to move out by December 1996 before the eventual demolition in 1997.

Clarke Quay was opened on 20 June 2003 together with all the North East Line stations. Construction work began for the Clarke Quay Central, which is a shopping mall and completed in January 2007.

References

External links

 Official website

Railway stations in Singapore opened in 2003
Singapore River
Mass Rapid Transit (Singapore) stations